Shannon Peters (born 8 May 1969) is a former professional Australian tennis player.

She turned professional in 1991 and retired in January 1996. Her career-high WTA singles ranking is 294, which she reached on 30 January 1995. Her highest doubles ranking is 186, set on 28 November 1994.

ITF finals

Singles (3–0)

Doubles (5–5)

References

External links
 
 

1969 births
Living people
Australian female tennis players
Sportswomen from New South Wales
Tennis players from Sydney